The 1972–73 Montenegrin Republic League was the 28th season of Montenegrin Republic League. The season started in August 1972 and finished in June 1973.

Season 

For the first time in competition history, on season 1972–73, in Montenegrin Republic League participated 14 teams. Among the teams which didn't play on previous season was Iskra (relegated from Yugoslav Second League) and five best teams from Regional leagues - Mogren, Petrovac, Dečić, Zeta and Jezero.
After 26 weeks, the title won Iskra. Second-placed was Petrovac with one point less than title winner. But, due to changes in the system of Yugoslav Second League, which predicted two instead four groups from season 1973–74, no one was promoted to higher rank.
Two lowest ranked teams - Mogren, Arsenal and Dečić were relegated to Regional leagues (fourth level).

Table

Higher leagues 
On season 1972–73, seven Montenegrin teams played in higher leagues of SFR Yugoslavia. Sutjeska was a member of 1972–73 Yugoslav First League. Five other teams (Budućnost, Lovćen, OFK Titograd, Bokelj, Rudar and Jedinstvo) participated in 1972–73 Yugoslav Second League.

See also 
 Montenegrin Republic League
Montenegrin Republic Cup (1947–2006)
Montenegrin clubs in Yugoslav football competitions (1946–2006)
Montenegrin Football Championship (1922–1940)

References 

Montenegrin Republic League